Mishawaka Reservoir Caretaker's Residence is a historic home located in Penn Township, St. Joseph County, Indiana.  The house was built in 1938 by the Works Progress Administration as a home for the caretaker of the Mishawaka Reservoir. It is a -story, rectangular, solid brick dwelling.  It has a three-sided bay window, gable roof, and fieldstone chimney.  The building was moved to its present location in 1995 to save it from demolition.

It was listed on the National Register of Historic Places in 1998.

References

Houses on the National Register of Historic Places in Indiana
Houses completed in 1938
Buildings and structures in St. Joseph County, Indiana
National Register of Historic Places in St. Joseph County, Indiana